Ainur Kerey (born 10 July 1984) is a Kazakhstani synchronized swimmer. She competed in the women's duet at the 2008 Summer Olympics.

References 

1984 births
Living people
Sportspeople from Almaty
Kazakhstani synchronized swimmers
Olympic synchronized swimmers of Kazakhstan
Synchronized swimmers at the 2008 Summer Olympics
Asian Games medalists in artistic swimming
Artistic swimmers at the 2006 Asian Games
Artistic swimmers at the 2010 Asian Games
Medalists at the 2006 Asian Games
Medalists at the 2010 Asian Games
Asian Games bronze medalists for Kazakhstan